The SS Yarmouth was a steel-hulled steamship owned by the Great Eastern Railway. She was built in 1903 for use on their cargo service between Harwich, Essex, and the Hook of Holland and Rotterdam, the Netherlands.  She was lost at sea with all hands on 27 October 1908.

Description
The vessel was powered by two triple expansion steam engines of 170 NHP (1,650 IHP) driving twin screw propellers. Steam was supplied by two boilers working at a pressure of 180psi. She was rigged as a schooner.

History
Yarmouth was built in 1903 as yard number 208 by Gourlay Brothers, Dundee, Perthshire. Built at a cost of £35,000, she was launched on 18 March 1903 and delivered to the Great Eastern Railway on 4 June. Her port of registry was Harwich, Essex. The United Kingdom Official Number 116175 was allocated.

Yarmouth had an uneventful five-year career on the Harwich–Hook of Holland route. She underwent a routine inspection and minor repairs by Earle's Shipbuilding, Hull, Yorkshire, between 13 and 17 September 1908.

Loss
Yarmouth was lost in circumstances that have never been fully explained.  The ship left the Hook of Holland having taken on cargo both there and at Rotterdam. At Rotterdam  of varied cargo had been loaded and at the Hook a further  of meat was loaded and as the holds were already quite full, some of this cargo of cased meat was stowed on the forecastle and poop deck.  Carrying a crew of 21 and one passenger (a relative of one of the ship's engineers) the Yarmouth sailed from the Hook at 10:30 am on 27 October 1908 and was next observed at 4:30 pm the same day  by the crew of the Outer Gabbard Lightship.  The lightship crew observed that the Yarmouth was listing heavily to starboard, so severely in fact, that the master of the lightship made a specific comment to this effect in his log.  At about 5:30 pm the lightship crew lost sight of the Yarmouth in misty rain, this was the last known sighting of the ship. Four hours later, the crew of a Norwegian ship, the  en route from Honfleur, Manche, France to Hull, saw debris in the water and heard cries.  The crew of the Fredheim searched for two hours but found no sign of the Yarmouth or its crew.

The following morning, the ship was reported to be missing. It was initially thought that there had probably been a problem with her engines being the reason she had not arrived at Harwich. No distress signal having been received. She returned to Harwich flying her flag at half-mast.

Court of inquiry
A Board of Trade inquiry into the loss of the Yarmouth was held at the Caxton Hall, Westminster, London in February and March 1909.  The court reported its findings on 4 March 1909 and concluded that the loss of the Yarmouth be attributed to carrying deck cargo (the crated meat on the poop and forecastle) which caused the ship to list to starboard and eventually causing the ship to capsize before the crew could attempt to save themselves. As a result of the loss of the Yarmouth the Great Eastern Railway discontinued the practice of carrying deck cargoes on all its vessels.

References

Steamships of the United Kingdom
Ships of the Great Eastern Railway
1903 ships
Merchant ships of the United Kingdom
1908 disasters in the United Kingdom
Shipwrecks in the North Sea
Ships lost with all hands
Maritime incidents in 1908
Ships built in Dundee
Schooners